Boninosuccinea is a genus of air-breathing land snails, terrestrial gastropod mollusks in the family Succineidae, the amber snails.

Species
Species within the genus Boninosuccinea include:

 Boninosuccinea ogasawarae
 Boninosuccinea punctulispira

References

Further reading 
 Abstract in English for one paper in Japanese on the genus:
 

Succineidae
Taxonomy articles created by Polbot